Ebya is a rural locality (a selo) in Mytakhsky Rural Okrug of Gorny District in the Sakha Republic, Russia, located  from Berdigestyakh, the administrative center of the district and  from Dikimdya, the administrative center of the rural okrug. Its population as of the 2002 Census was 25.

References

Notes

Sources
Official website of the Sakha Republic. Registry of the Administrative-Territorial Divisions of the Sakha Republic. Gorny District. 

Rural localities in Gorny District